General elections are schedule to be held in Barbados by 2027 to elect the 30 members of the House of Assembly.

References

Elections in Barbados
Barbados